Herbert Arthur Krause (May 25, 1905 - September 22, 1976) was an American historian, author and college professor. He was born and educated in Minnesota and South Dakota, where he taught and wrote. He was the author of novels, plays, poems, essays, and reviews. He also worked towards preservation of cultural heritage.

Background
Herbert Arthur Krause, a third-generation German American, was born on May 25, 1905 on a small farm in Friberg Township, Otter Tail County, north of Fergus Falls, Minnesota to Arthur Adolph Krause (a farmer and blacksmith) and Bertha Peters. He was educated at St. Olaf College (B.A., 1933) and the University of Iowa (M.A., 1935).

He taught at the University of Iowa starting in 1938. After the success of Wind Without Rain, he moved to Augustana College (now known as Augustana University) in Sioux Falls, South Dakota, where he taught in the English department and was director of the Center for Western Studies until his 1976 death.

Career as writer
Krause was influenced by the writing of Ole Rolvaag, with whom he had hoped to study at St. Olaf but was unable to do so. He wrote three novels, Wind Without Rain, The Thresher, and The Oxcart Trail, detailing the prairies of the American West. Herbert Krause won the Friends of American Writers Award in 1939 for Wind Without Rain.

Death and legacy
Herbert Krause died of congestive heart failure in 1976, at the age of 71, in Sioux Falls.

In 1978 he was inducted into the South Dakota Hall of Fame, in the category of Education & Cultural Affairs. The Herbert A. Krause Collection at the Center for Western Studies contains collections of his papers and correspondence.

Selected bibliography
 Neighbor Boy. (Midland House, Iowa City, Iowa: 1939) 
 Wind without Rain. (1939; rpt. Sioux Falls, South Dakota: Brevet Press, 1976)
The Thresher. (1946; rpt. Brevet Press. Sioux Falls, South Dakota: 1980)
 Giant in the Wooded Earth; Minnesota centennial verses (St. Olaf College. Northfield, Minnesota.  1962)
 The Oxcart Trail. (1954; rpt. Brevet Press, Sioux Falls, South Dakota: 1976)
Prelude to Glory: A Newspaper Accounting of Custer's 1874 Expedition to the Black Hills (Edited by Gary Olson. Brevet Press, Sioux Falls, South Dakota: 1974)
 Birding in the Northern Plains: The Ornithological Writings of Herbert Krause (Ronald R. Nelson, Editor. The Center for Western Studies.  2008)
 Poems and Essays of Herbert Krause (Arthur R Huseboe, editor.  Center for Western Studies.  Sioux Falls, South Dakota. 1990)

References

Additional sources
Huseboe, Arthur R., Herbert Krause (Boise State University. Western Series No. 66, December 1985) available online via Western Writers Series Digital Editions
Paulson, Kristoffer E., Ole Rolvaag, Herbert Krause and the Frontier Thesis of Frederick Jackson Turner ( from Where the West Begins, edited by Arthur R. Huseboe and William Geyer, pp. 22–33, Center for Western Studies Press. Sioux Falls, South Dakota. 1978)

External links
Center for Western Studies at Augustana College
South Dakota Hall of Fame
Augustana College Website

1905 births
1976 deaths
People from Otter Tail County, Minnesota
20th-century American novelists
American Lutherans
American male novelists
Augustana University people
Historians of the United States
Writers from Sioux Falls, South Dakota
St. Olaf College alumni
University of Iowa alumni
University of Iowa faculty
Novelists from Minnesota
20th-century American historians
20th-century American male writers
Novelists from Iowa
American people of German descent
American male non-fiction writers
Historians from Minnesota
Historians from South Dakota
20th-century Lutherans